Nina Lykke (born 1949) is a Danish–Swedish gender studies scholar. She is noted for her work on feminist theory, and is distinguished professor of gender studies at Linköping University in Sweden.

Biography
Nina Lykke was born in Copenhagen, Denmark. She received a mag.art. (PhD) degree in literature at the University of Copenhagen in 1981 and a dr.phil. (higher doctoral degree) in gender studies at Odense University, Denmark in 1992. From 1984 until 1999 she was director of the Centre for Women's and Gender Studies, the first of its kind in Denmark, at the University of Southern Denmark. She was an assistant professor from 1981 and was promoted to associate professor in 1986. In 1999 she was appointed as a professor of gender studies at Linköping University, where she is head of Tema Gender. She was granted the title of distinguished professor by the university in 2008.

Nina Lykke’s research focuses on feminist theory, including intersectionality studies, feminist cultural studies and feminist technoscience studies.

She is director of the international Centre of Gender Excellence, GEXcel, of the Nordic Research School in Interdisciplinary Gender Studies  and of the PhD Programme in Interdisciplinary Gender Studies at Linköping University.

She is associate editor of the European Journal of Women's Studies and advisor for several other scholarly feminist journals.

Honours

She received an honorary doctorate at Karlstad University in 2016.

Selected bibliography

References

External links
Publications, Nina Lykke, Linköping University Electronic Press

1949 births
Gender studies academics
Academic staff of Linköping University
Living people
Swedish women academics
Intersectional feminism